Gwalior Municipal Corporation (GMC) is the Municipal Corporation established in 1887,it is responsible for the civic infrastructure and administration of the city of Gwalior, located in Madhya Pradesh, India. The GMC is formally headed by Mrs. Shobha Satish Sikarwar(INC), present Mayor of Gwalior.

Overview

The city is currently divided into 66 wards. Each ward elects a corporator. The winning party elects a council of members, who are responsible for various departments. The council members chose the Mayor among themselves. At present, there are sixty one members in the council. The Commissioner of Gwalior is the highest officer of Municipal Corporate Office, which is responsible for the departments of public works, revenue and tax, water supply, planning and development, fire brigade, health and sanitation, finance and accounts etc. The current Municipal Commissioner of Gwalior is Shri. Kishor Kanyal (I A S), while the current Mayor is Mrs.Shobha Satish Sikarwar.

History

1887 to 1912
Gwalior Municipal Corporation came into existence on 6 June 1887. It was established by the Council of Regency which was responsible for administration of the Gwalior Estate.
 
In 1904, general functions of urban local bodies like city planning, sanitation etc. were assigned to the Gwalior Municipal Corporation along with establishment of a separate Municipal Corporation for Old Gwalior.
 
In the year 1912, yet another Municipal Corporation was established for Morar Nagar. It functioned in accordance with the Municipal Act which was formulated in 1911 but was implemented in 1912.

1913 to 1954
After the implementation of Municipal Corporation Act in the year 1913, a separate Governing body was established by the elected members of board and His Highness, Madhavrao Scindia resigned from the post of Chairperson which he occupied until 1912.

In the year 1922, a new board was formed with 45 members, where 30 members were elected, and 15 members were nominated from different parts of the city. During the governance of this board, Gwalior city saw many remarkable changes, most remarkable being the establishment of a Power House at Motijheel and Water Supply Plant to supply water to the entire city.

The Municipal Corporation Act which was implemented in the year 1912 saw some amendments in the year 1936 and was implemented with fresh rules for governance in the year 1937. Salient features of this amendment included the power to select Chairperson through voting by the members of the Council. Before this amendment the Chairperson was elected by nomination.

1954 to present
After independence the Municipal Corporation Act was revised yet again and this paved way for establishment of Central India Municipal Corporation Act in the year 1954. This led to an increase in the limits of Gwalior Municipal Corporation to include another 18 square miles.

In 1956, the reorganizing of states of India led to creation of Madhya Pradesh. This resulted in Gwalior and Indore Municipalities being awarded the status of Municipal Corporations and the implementation of new Municipal Corporation Act. GMC was divided into 34 blocks and was governed by 40 elected members and 10 members of Central India Municipal Corporation who were transferred by voting method.

The elections of Municipal Council were again held in 1969 in which out of the 52 councilors, 42 councilors were elected and 10 councilors were nominated by the elected members.

Gwalior Municipal Corporation was again restructured on 24 May 1983 and the number of elected members was increased to 52 with 10 nominated members and Mayor of the Gwalior Municipal Corporation.

The term of the Council ended in 1987 which led to the State Government taking charge of the Corporation for 7 years. In the year 1994, elections were held and the number of members was increased to 67 members, 60 of which were elected and 6 councilors were nominated by the Government. In 1994, State Government created the post of Chairperson of the council who was elected by the councilors.

In the year 2000, the process of election was changed and the Councilors and Mayor were elected directly by the public to create a council for the term of 5 years. In the year 2004 the election were held again and the Council is still in term with 60 elected councilors, 6 members nominated by the Government and the Mayor.

Departments
Fire Brigade 
Property Dayara (Property Record Keeping)
Udyan (Public Garden Maintenance) 
Zoo
Revenue 
Dukan Sansthan (Shop Establishment License)
Building Permission 
Colony Layout
G.A.D. 
Legal Section 
Pension 
Payroll
Workshop 
Accounts 
Complaints 
PHE (Public Health Engineering)
Property (Record Keeping)
Birth Death (Record keeping)
Central Purchase 
Parishad (Council)

Revenue sources 

The following are the Income sources for the Corporation from the Central and State Government.

Revenue from taxes 
Following is the Tax related revenue for the corporation.

 Property tax.
 Profession tax.
 Entertainment tax.
 Grants from Central and State Government like Goods and Services Tax.
 Advertisement tax.

Revenue from non-tax sources 

Following is the Non Tax related revenue for the corporation.

 Water usage charges.
 Fees from Documentation services.
 Rent received from municipal property.
 Funds from municipal bonds.

See also
List of municipal corporations in India

References

External links
official website

Municipal corporations in Madhya Pradesh
Gwalior
1887 establishments in India